Alexandra Vitaliyevna Kapustina (born 7 April 1984) is a Russian ice hockey defender.

International career
Kapustina was selected for the Russia national women's ice hockey team in the 2006 and 2010 Winter Olympics and 2014 In 2010, she led her team in ice time, and recorded two assists. In 2006, she scored one goal in the five games.

Kapustina has also appeared for Russia at eight IIHF Women's World Championships. Her first appearance came in 2004. She was a member of the teams that won a bronze medal at the 2013 and 2016 IIHF Women's World Championships.

Career statistics

International career

References

External links
Eurohockey.com Profile

1984 births
Living people
Ice hockey players at the 2006 Winter Olympics
Ice hockey players at the 2010 Winter Olympics
Ice hockey players at the 2014 Winter Olympics
Olympic ice hockey players of Russia
People from Pervouralsk
Russian women's ice hockey defencemen
Sportspeople from Sverdlovsk Oblast